Bernard Etxepare (pronounced ) was a Basque writer of the 16th century, most famous for a collection of poems titled Linguæ Vasconum Primitiæ ("First Fruits of the Basque Language") he published in 1545, the first book to be published in the Basque language.

Spellings of the name
His first name is also spelled Bernat or Beñat in Basque, he himself used Bernat. His surname is spelled Etxepare in modern Basque but the variant Detxepare is also occasionally encountered, in Basque or Dechepare in Spanish, both based on the French spelling D'echepare. He himself used Dechepare.

Life
Very little is known about his life. He was born c. 1470–1480 in the area of Saint-Jean-Pied-de-Port in Lower Navarre. His birthplace is the Etxeparia farmhouse in Bussunarits-Sarrasquette, and he spent the majority of his life in the valleys of Cize, working as rector in Saint-Michel at the church of Saint-Michel-le-Vieux and vicar in Saint-Jean-Pied-de-Port.

Etxepare lived through a period of war and upheaval from 1512 onward with the Castilian conquest of Upper Navarre. In one of his poems, Mossen Bernat echaparere cantuya, he confesses to having spent time in prison in Béarn, although the reasons for his detainment are not very clear. According to some, he was accused of having taken the side of Castile in its conflict with Navarre, not least of all due to religious reasons. Others, however, think that the reasons for his incarceration were moral rather than political. Either way, Etxepare maintained that he was innocent.

The date of his death is unknown.

Linguæ Vasconum Primitiæ
In 1545 he published a book in Bordeaux, the Linguæ Vasconum Primitiæ, generally assumed to be the first book ever printed in Basque. It contains a collection of poems, some religious in nature, some love poems, one about his life, some extolling the virtues of the Basque language and others. It has been suggested by Oihenart in his L´art poétique basque from 1665 that some of his prestigious contemporary Basque writers such as Joan Etxegarai and Arnaut Logras who were famous for their pastorals might have been published too. However, if they were, any evidence has been lost.

It is written in the Lower Navarrese dialect of Basque, using a French-influenced orthography and the metre and style of writing suggest that Etxepare was a bertsolari, a type of Basque poet known for producing sung extemporised poetry.

The book contains:
 Foreword
 Doctrina Christiana "Christian Doctrine"
 Hamar manamenduyak "The Ten Commandments"
 Iudicio generala "General Judgement"
 Amorosen gaztiguya "The Disappointment of Lovers"
 Emazten favore "In Defense of Women"
 Ezconduyen coplac "The Couplet of the Married Couple"
 Amoros secretuguidena "The Secret Lover"
 Amorosen partizia "The Separation of Lovers"
 Amoros gelosia "The Jealous Lover"
 Potaren galdacia "Asking for a Kiss"
 Amorez errequericia "Requesting Love"
 Amorosen disputa "The Lovers Dispute"
 Ordu gayçarequi horrat zazquiçat
 Amore gogorren despira "Contempt for the Harsh Mother"
 Mossen Bernat echaparere cantuya "The Song of Mosén Bernat Etxepare"
 Contrapas
 Sautrela
 Extraict des regestes de Parlement

The following example is the Contrapas, which is a poem that broadly sets out Etxepare's motivation for producing this book and his hopes for the language. Etxepare explains that he is the first Basque writer to have his work published in print. He calls for the Basque language to "go out" and become more widely known, for the Basques to blaze new trails and make themselves known to the world.

Note that the above rendition into Standard Basque contains several words which would be spelled like that but are rarely used. Instead of lengoaje "language" the indigenous terms mintzaira or hizkuntza would be most widely used today for example.

The only surviving original copy of the book is kept at the National Library of France in Paris. Irrespective of its literary value, his book has enjoyed enduring fame amongst Basques. Especially the last two pieces of his book, or excerpts thereof, are frequently quoted or used otherwise in the Basque scene. During the 1960s for example the Basque musician Xabier Lete produced a musical score to accompany the Kontrapas. More recently, a newly developed speech recognition software tool has been named Sautrela after the final poem in Etxepare's book and a Basque literature series in Basque Television is also named Sautrela.

References

External links
Online edition of Linguae Vasconum Primitiae.

Year of birth unknown
Year of death missing
People from Lower Navarre
French-Basque people
Basque-language poets
16th-century male writers
Christian writers
Basque culture
Kingdom of Navarre
Basque-language writers